Haritalodes derogata, the cotton leaf roller or okra leaf roller, is a species of moth of the family Crambidae. It was described by Johan Christian Fabricius in 1775. It is widely distributed. Records include the Comoros, the Democratic Republic of the Congo, Ghana, Mali, Réunion, Madagascar, the Seychelles, South Africa, the Gambia, Australia, Fiji, Papua New Guinea, Samoa, the Solomon Islands, the Andaman Islands, Bali, India, Sri Lanka, Malaysia, Myanmar, Singapore, Sri Lanka, Vietnam, China and Japan. It is sometimes encountered in Europe, due to accidental import.

The wingspan is 28–40 mm. Adults are pale brown with complex dark brown sinuous lines over each wing.

The larvae feed on Hibiscus (including H. cannabinus, H. esculentus, H. columnaris and H. rosa-sinensis), Pavonia, Gossypium, Anacardium occidentale, Sida, Glycine max, Zizyphus mauritiana and Zizyphus jujuba. They roll the leaves of their host plant. The larvae are green with a dark brown head in early instars, but later becoming dark pink. Full-grown larvae reach a length of about 15 mm. Pupation takes place in the rolled leaf.

References

Moths described in 1775
Spilomelinae
Moths of Africa
Moths of Asia
Moths of Oceania
Taxa named by Johan Christian Fabricius